House-Sitting Songs is an album of demos released by British artist Lightspeed Champion onto the internet via his MySpace account (before hastily being removed). It was written and recorded in a week while he was house-sitting for a friend.

The album features a duet with Charlotte Froom of The Like on a cover of a Patience and Prudence song, as well as another cover of a song by The Organ.

Track listing

References 

Dev Hynes albums
2009 EPs